Todd Soundelux is an American creative entertainment services company.

The company's main activity is to provide creative and technical post production sound and music services for motion picture studios, independent producers, broadcast networks, cable channels, advertising agencies and other companies that produce, own or distribute content.  The company maintains facilities in Hollywood, California, Burbank, California, and Santa Monica, California.

History
2008: Ascent Media Group's Creative Sound Services group spun off from Discovery Holding Company to create CSS Studios, LLC, a wholly owned subsidiary of Discovery Communications. This included the assets of Todd-AO, Soundelux, Sound One, POP Sound, Modern Music, Soundelux Design Music Group and The Hollywood Edge.
2012: On September 19, Empire Investment Holdings announced it had acquired CSS Studios, LLC from Discovery Communications, Inc. 
2013: In January 2013, CSS Studios announced it would rename the company as Todd-Soundelux.
2014: In May 2014, Todd Soundelux filed for Chapter 11 bankruptcy protection, and was seeking to reorganize. As part of the bankruptcy proceedings, they closed their Hollywood and Santa Monica facilities, leaving only their Burbank location operational.

Related companies

Subsidiaries
Todd-AO
 Burbank, California
 Hollywood, California
 Santa Monica, California
Soundelux
 Hollywood, California
Hollywood Edge
 Hollywood, California

Notable creative staff

Feature films
Bill Abbott - music editor - Oz the Great and Powerful;Brave; Men In Black 3; Spider-Man 2; Alice in Wonderland
Tom Bellfort - Supervising Sound Editor - Source Code; The Pacific; Titanic; Mission: Impossible; Star Wars Episode I: The Phantom Menace
Lon Bender - Supervising Sound Editor - 2 Guns; The Hunger Games; Drive; Defiance; The Blood Diamond
Kelly Cabral - Supervising Sound Editor - The Purge; Dark Skies; Kill the Irishman; The Perfect Storm
Patrick Cyccone - Re-recording mixer - The Descendants; Day Watch; Halloween 2; Mean Girls
Andrew DeCristofaro - Supervising Sound Editor - Iron Man 3; The Heat; A Nightmare on Elm Street; Little Miss Sunshine
Marshall Garlington - Re-recording mixer - CBGB; The Perks of Being a Wallflower; Jackass Presents: Bad Grandpa
Gary Hecker - Foley Artist - Man of Steel; Pacific Rim; Django Unchained; Robin Hood; The Hunger Games; Nightmare on Elm Street
Adam Jenkins - Re-recording mixer - Law Abiding Citizen; Forgetting Sarah Marshall; Thank You For Smoking; Crash
Kenneth Karman - supervising music editor - Flight; The A-Team; A Christmas Carol; G.I. Joe: The Rise of Cobra; Beowulf
Tony Lamberti - Re-recording mixer - Django Unchained; The Twilight Saga: Breaking Dawn - Part 1 & 2; RED; Inglourious Basterds
Daniel J. Leahy - Re-recording mixer - Olympus Has Fallen; Alex Cross; Kiss Kiss Bang Bang; The Fast and the Furious
Dave McMoyler - Supervising Sound Editor - Final Destination 5; RED; Snakes on a Plane; Flightplan; Wedding Crashers
Christian Minkler - Re-recording mixer - Riddick; The Heat; End of Watch; Babel
Michael Minkler - Re-recording mixer - Django Unchained; Inglourious Basterds; Chicago; Dreamgirls; Black Hawk Down
Kevin O′Connell - Re-recording mixer - Muppets Most Wanted; Transformers; Apocalypto; Spider-Man 2; Memoirs of a Geisha
Mark Paterson - Re-recording mixer - The World′s End; Les Misérables; Attack the Block; Children of Men
Wylie Stateman - Supervising Sound Editor - Django Unchained; Robin Hood; Inglourious Basterds; Memoirs of a Geisha; Kill Bill; Natural Born Killers; JFK
Michael Wilhoit - Supervising Sound Editor - Jackass Presents: Bad Grandpa; Furry Vengeance; Hurricane Season; Madea Goes to Jail; Almost Famous

Television
Onnalee Blank - Re-recording mixer - Game of Thrones
Jim Fitzpatrick - Re-recording mixer - Family Guy; American Dad; The Cleveland Show; Melrose Place
Dennis Kirk - Re-recording mixer - The Newsroom; Big Love; Entourage; Supernatural; Prison Break
Mace Matiosian Supervising Sound Editor - CSI: Crime Scene Investigation; Star Trek: Deep Space Nine; Star Trek: The Next Generation
Todd Orr - Re-recording mixer - Big Love; The Sopranos; Band of Brothers: Flipper
Yuri Reese - Re-recording mixer - CSI: Crime Scene Investigation; CSI: Miami; Without a Trace
Keith Rogers - Re-recording mixer - Perception; Person of Interest; Bones
Alec St. John - Re-recording mixer - Mad Men; The Glades; Body of Proof; Entourage
Greg Schorer - Supervising Sound Editor - NCIS: Naval Criminal Investigative Service; JAG;
William Smith - Re-recording mixer - CSI: Crime Scene Investigation; CSI: Miami; Without a Trace
Ken Teaney - Re-recording mixer - Mad Men; Saving Grace; Dollhouse;
Scott Weber - Re-recording mixer - Person of Interest; TRON: Uprising; Alacatraz; Lost

Notable industry recognition

References

External links
 Official site Archived from the original on March 27, 2013.
 Todd-AO website
 Soundelux website
 The Hollywood Edge website
 Modern Music website

Film production companies of the United States